General the Hon. Edward Finch (26 April 1756 – 27 October 1843) was a British Army general and a member of parliament.

He was the fifth son of Heneage Finch, 3rd Earl of Aylesford and entered Westminster School in 1768 and Trinity College, Cambridge in 1773. He was awarded a B.A. in 1777.

He joined the British Army as a cornet in the 11th Dragoons in 1778, soon transferring to the 20th Light Dragoons, and the following year was promoted lieutenant into the 87th Regiment of Foot. He served in the West Indies and North America before being promoted a captain in the Coldstream Guards in 1783.

In May 1789 he was elected MP for Cambridge, a seat he held continuously until 1819.

In 1792 he was promoted captain and lieutenant-colonel and went with the Guards Brigade as part of the 1793 Flanders Campaign under General Lake. He was present at the actions of Caesar's Camp, Famars, and Lincelles, and at the battles of Hondschoote, Lannoy, Turcoing, and Tournay, remaining with his corps throughout the campaign. He was promoted colonel in 1796.

He was present with the Guards during the Irish Rebellion of the Irish Rebellion of 1798, and commanded the 1st Battalion, Coldstream Guards in the Anglo-Russian invasion of Holland of 1799 and at the defeat at Bergen in September of that year.

In 1800 he was in Egypt in command of a brigade of cavalry and was promoted major-general on New Year's Day, 1801. In 1804 he was appointed a Groom of the Bedchamber to the King. In 1809 he took a brigade of Guards to Denmark, taking an active role in the bombardment of Copenhagen but did not see active service after that time.

In 1808 he was appointed Regimental Colonel of the 54th Regiment of Foot, transferred in 1809 to the 22nd Foot, and on 12 August 1819 was promoted full general.

He died unmarried in 1843.

References

|-

|-

|-

1756 births
1843 deaths
People educated at Westminster School, London
Alumni of Trinity College, Cambridge
British Army generals
British MPs 1784–1790
British MPs 1790–1796
British MPs 1796–1800
UK MPs 1801–1802
UK MPs 1802–1806
UK MPs 1806–1807
UK MPs 1807–1812
UK MPs 1812–1818
UK MPs 1818–1820
Younger sons of earls
Members of the Parliament of Great Britain for English constituencies
Members of the Parliament of the United Kingdom for English constituencies